Between Heaven and Hell is Firewind's first album released in 2002 through Massacre Records in Europe, Leviathan Records in the US, EMI in Japan and Rock Brigade in South America. There were 3 different versions of the cover art, European, Japanese and American.
The album was re-released on 10 October 2007 with the European artwork originally designed by Kristian Wåhlin and with 2 bonus demo tracks.

Track listing

 "Between Heaven and Hell" – 4:51
 "Warrior" – 4:44
 "World of Conflict" – 4:04
 "Destination Forever" – 3:44
 "Oceans" (Instrumental) – 1:49
 "Tomorrow Can Wait" – 5:39
 "Pictured Life"  – 3:36
 "Firewind Raging" – 4:26
 "I Will Fight Alone" – 5:09
 "Northern Sky"  – 4:50
 "Fire" – 4:38
 "Who Am I?" – 5:18 
 "End of an Era" – 1:52 
 "Fire"  – 4:30 (re-release bonus track)
 "Destination Forever"  – 3:28

Personnel
Band members
 Stephen Fredrick – vocals
 Gus G. – guitars, keyboards
 Konstantine – bass
 Brian Harris – drums

References

Firewind albums
2002 debut albums
Massacre Records albums